Educational institutions are often categorised along several dimensions.  The most important is perhaps the age or level of the students in the institution, but funding source, affiliation, and gender, racial, or ethnic exclusivity are also commonly used.

By age

Infants and toddlers
This level of education is for children up to about age 5.  In most places, it is still optional, with some students staying home with parents until the next stage.  Schools of this type are often not part of any formal education system, and many are not free of charge even where the school system as a whole is.
 Nursery school
 Reception (chiefly UK)
 Preschool
 Daycare
 Kindergarten

Primary school
The first years of the formal educational system are known most generally as "primary school", although they also have the following names in some areas (not all entirely synonymous):
 Elementary school
 Grammar school
 Grade school
 Infant school
 First school
 Junior school
 Lower school

Middle school
Many jurisdictions have no formal "middle" level between primary school and secondary school, but in those that do, "middle school" is a generic term for it. Some areas treat "junior high" as an interchangeable synonym for "middle school", but others maintain a distinction as to level (junior high being slightly higher) or style (junior high being modeled more closely after a secondary school).  Some jurisdictions have both, in which case the middle school is typically grades 5–6 and the junior high grades 7–8. Some also use "intermediate" school.

In some areas, there is no formal middle school, but the secondary schools have a "junior division".  This is more common among private schools.

In England, a "preparatory school" is a specific type of middle school.

Secondary school
Secondary school can start at different ages (typically anywhere from 11 to 15). They usually educate children up to the ages of 18 or 19.  They go by a variety of now-mostly-synonymous names:
 High school
 Vocational-technical school
 Comprehensive high school
 Upper school
 Grammar school
 Secondary school
 Secondary modern school
 Sixth form college
 College preparatory school (or just "prep school")
 Academy
 Lyceum (esp. in areas with Continental European influence)
 Gymnasium (in areas with German influence)
 College (archaic, see below)

Post-secondary education
There is no truly generic term for all post-secondary education.  Some types of post-secondary (or tertiary) education include:
 University
 Comprehensive college
 Liberal arts college
 Technical school
 Seminary
 Normal school (archaic)
 Junior college or community college
 Vocational school, Polytechnic or Technical University

A special note about the term "college": in North American and especially US usage, this is a truly generic term for all post-secondary education, right up to and including university, but can also be understood to mean a smaller, four-year, baccalaureate institution.  Elsewhere, it is more commonly understood to mean only the junior colleges and vocational schools.  An older usage still persists in the proper names of some secondary schools.  Generally, the term is not suitable for an international audience without further definition.

Postgraduate education
Schools that offer postgraduate education are often, but not always, one unit of a larger university.  Categories include:
 Graduate school
 Professional school
 Medical school
 Law school
 Business school

By funding source
Another major classifier is whether the institution is state-funded or not.(1)  This is complicated by contradictory international usage.

 Public schools (or, in the U.K. and parts of the Commonwealth, State schools) receive nearly all their funding from the government.  Most are open to all students.
 Magnet schools are a type of public school with enrollment restricted according to placement test scores or admission.  In some cases, racial or ethnic quotas are also used. Some magnet schools are also called "exam schools" that offer a specialized curriculum and have competitive admission.
 Charter schools, which started in the 1990s, are in much of the United States and in Alberta, Canada.  They are funded like other public schools, but are run independently of any school district, with separate oversight bodies.
 In the US, "State schools" refers chiefly to publicly funded universities.
 Comprehensive schools are state schools that do not select its intake based on academic achievement or aptitude. 
 In Canada, "Separate schools" are publicly funded religious schools.
 In England, academies are state schools which receive their funding direct from central government and which are allowed a great deal of operational and administrative freedom in the way in which they operate.
 In New Zealand, state-integrated schools are former private schools which have integrated into the country's state education system, becoming state schools but retaining their religious or philosophical character.
 Private schools or Independent schools (or, in the U.K. and parts of the Commonwealth, Public schools) are those owned by a private (non-government) entity, and that normally receive some or all of their funding through tuition charged to individual students.
 Parochial schools are those attached to a particular parish or congregation, or possibly religious schools in general.
 In England, "Grammar school" is a specific type of school catering for the more able student. Grammar schools in England can be found either in the state sector (i.e., publicly funded) or in the private sector (i.e., fee-paying schools).

Note (1): While full public (aka state) funding generally denotes a public school in North America, technically this isn't always the case, and isn't the literal definition of a public school.  A government may provide full funding for a student to go to a private school, such as school vouchers, even paying for all students at such a school, but it remains private, as a private organization owns and controls the school.  Conversely, a "public" school may charge high fees, and seek other private funding sources, but be "public" by virtue of the "public" owning and controlling the school (e.g., it is owned by a public school board, or other public authority).

By gender

Historically, most schools were segregated by gender (and many more were all-male than all-female).  The modern norm is for schools to be coeducational; the vast majority of publicly funded schools in the English-speaking world are so, although this is not universal worldwide.  Many private schools, both religious and secular, remain single-sex schools.

By race, language, ethnicity
Until the mid-20th century, schools in much of the US were explicitly  racially segregated.  This is no longer the case, although a number of institutions of higher learning still call themselves historically black colleges.

In many areas of the world where different ethnicities coexist, especially when different languages are spoken in those communities, parallel school systems are often organised to serve them.  Motivations for this can vary; such a system can be oppressive if one of the parallel systems is inferior to the other, but it can be empowering if it enables a minority community to perpetuate its languages, traditions, and norms.

By living arrangements
 Residential schools are those where most or all students live at the school.
 Boarding school is a term for residential schools that carries connotations of being private, old, and/or elite.
 A day school is a private school where no students live at the school; the term is used in contexts where this is not the default, and dates from a time when most private schools were boarding schools.

By exclusivity
Selective schools are those that only allow students to enter if they achieved successful results in an annual entrance examination. These schools are commonly the highest ranked schools in Australia where they are especially prevalent in New South Wales and Victoria. 
Partially selective schools have accelerated classes set aside for students who have achieved successful.
Geographically selective schools only allow students from a certain zone to enter. In some cases these schools are selective in allowing any students from outside this zone.

Miscellaneous
 Military schools are secondary schools, run under strict disciplinary regimens and providing military training, but also providing a general secondary education. (Chiefly U.S.)
 Classical and Christian schools structure education according to the ancient Trivium of liberal arts. They often require the study of Latin, formal logic and formal rhetoric.
 International schools are schools that promote international education.
 Art school is an educational institution with a primary focus on visual arts.
 Special school is a school for students with special needs.
 Specialist school is a secondary school that specializes in a particular discipline. (UK)
 Specialized school is  a secondary school that specializes in a particular discipline. (US, former USSR)
 Alternative school is an institution which provides alternative education.
 Laboratory school is an elementary or secondary school operated in association with a university, college, or other teacher education institution and used for the training.
 K-12 school is a school that serves grades of primary and secondary education.
 Adult high school is a high school facility designed for adult education.
 K-8 school is a school that serves grades in the primary and intermediate level of education. (Chiefly US)

See also

 Glossary of education-related terms